Andrzej Koszewski (Poznań, 26 July 1922 – 17 February 2015) was a Polish composer, musicologist and teacher. His students included Lidia Zielińska, Krzesimir Dębski and Bettina Skrzypczak.

References

1922 births
2015 deaths
Musicians from Poznań
Polish composers
Polish musicologists